Reutlingen (Swabian: Reitlenga) is a city in Baden-Württemberg, Germany. It is the capital of the eponymous district of Reutlingen. As of June 2018, it has an estimated population of 116,456. Reutlingen has a university of applied sciences, which was founded in 1855, originally as a weavers' school. Today, Reutlingen is home to an established textile industry and also houses machinery, leather goods and steel manufacturing facilities. It has the narrowest street in the world, Spreuerhofstraße (width 31 cm).

Geography

It lies in the Southwest corner of Germany, right next to the Swabian Jura, and that is why it is often called The gateway to the Swabian Jura. The Echaz river, a tributary of the Neckar, flows through the city centre.

It is also part of the larger Stuttgart Metropolitan Region.

History

The first settlements in the area are believed to date from the 4th or 5th century.
Some time around 1030, Count Egino started to build a castle on top of the Achalm, one of the largest mountains in Reutlingen district (about 706 m). One of the towers of this castle was rebuilt in the 19th century and is open to visitors. The name Reutlingen was first mentioned in writing in the so-called Bempflingen Treaty which is dated approximately 1089–90.

Around 1180, Reutlingen received market rights and, between 1220 and 1240 it was promoted to city status and city-walls and fortifications were built. Shortly thereafter, from 1247 to 1343, the city's landmark, the St. Mary's Church was built.

In 1377 Reutlingen was the scene of a victory by the Swabian League, formed in the previous year by 14 Swabian cities, led by Ulm, over the Count of Württemberg. In 1519, a later Swabian League came to Reutlingen's help when Ulrich, Duke of Württemberg attempted to seize the city; the League landed a crushing blow, conquering Württemberg and selling it to Charles V.
In 1495 and 1516 the Jews were exiled from the city.
 
As a result of such struggles, Reutlingen became an Imperial City of the Holy Roman Empire, free from allegiance to the Duke of Württemberg. In 1530, Reutlingen's city council signed the Augsburg Confession, and in 1580 and the Formula of Concord, key documents of Lutheranism. In 1803, in the wake of the French Revolutionary Wars, Reutlingen lost its independence in the German Mediatisation, being restored to Württemberg.

The worst disaster in the history of Reutlingen happened in 1726, when a major fire swept through the city, destroying 80% of all residential houses and almost all public buildings, and making 1,200 families homeless. The impact of this fire, which lasted three days, is still visible today.

During World War II, the wings of the V-1 flying bomb were manufactured in Reutlingen, making the city the target of several allied bombing raids.

The reconstruction of Reutlingen and its democratization is closely linked to the name Oskar Kalbfells, who was the first democratically elected mayor of the city to shape Reutlingen's political history until 1973 after World War II.

In 1947 Reutlingen came to the newly founded state of Württemberg-Hohenzollern, which merged with the state of Baden-Württemberg in 1952.

On 24 July 2016 a Syrian killed a pregnant woman in a machete attack.

Lord mayors
 1929–1933: Karl Haller 
 1933–1945: Richard Dederer, NSDAP
 1945–1973: Oskar Kalbfell, SPD
 1973–1994: Manfred Oechsle, CDU
 1995–2003: Stefan Schultes, CDU
 2003–2019: Barbara Bosch, independent
 since 2019 Thomas Keck, SPD

Transport

City buses are run by Reutlinger Stadtverkehr (RSV), while trains from Reutlingen Hauptbahnhof and Reutlingen West, -Sondelfingen and Reutlingen-Betzingen are run by Deutsche Bahn and Abellio Rail Baden-Württemberg.

Main sights

 Church of the Virgin Mary, built in Gothic style in the 13th–14th centuries. Nearby is a statue of emperor Frederick II.
 Marktbrunnen ("Market Fountain", 16th century), surmounted by the statue of emperor Maximilian II.
 Spitalhof, built as a hospital in the 14th century. Damaged by a fire, it was largely rebuilt in the 18th century.
 Church of St. Nicholas, built in the 14th century as a chapel.
 Gerber- und Färberbrunnen ("Tanners' and Dyers' Fountain"), 1920.
 City hall, built in 2013.
 Spreuerhofstraße, the world's narrowest street.

Culture
On Mutscheltag (the first Thursday after Epiphany), townspeople gather in halls and homes to play games of dice, the winner of which earns parts or whole Mutschel loaves of bread. The Mutschelspiele (Mutschel games) consist of small games scored by tally marks, and are won both independently and by grand total at the end of the hour or night. This tradition is unique to the city of Reutlingen.

Education

Reutlingen University is a university of applied sciences, focusing on hands-on learning, which is apparent in their mandatory internship for all business majors. The university is an internationally friendly school with over 200 university cooperations worldwide. Classes are generally taught in German; however, in some Bachelor programs and in the Master's programs classes are taught in English.

Climate

Twin towns – sister cities

Reutlingen is twinned with:

 Aarau, Switzerland (1986)
 Bouaké, Ivory Coast (1970)
 Dushanbe, Tajikistan (1990)
 Ellesmere Port, England, UK (1966)
 Reading, United States (1998)
 Roanne, France (1958)
 Szolnok, Hungary (1990)

Notable people
Friedrich List (1789–1846), German-American economist
Ernst Boepple (1887–1950), Nazi official and SS officer executed for war crimes
Ferdinand Heim (1895–1971), general, the "Scapegoat of Stalingrad" 
Erwin Fischer (1904–1996), jurist
Helmuth Naumer (1907–1990), artist 
Friedrich Schlotterbeck (1909–1979), socialist, resistance fighter and author
Walter Vielhauer (1909–1986), trade unionist, politician, resistance fighter
Gertrud Lutz (1910–1944), resistance fighter
Willy Hack (1912–1952), SS officer and concentration camp official executed for war crimes
Walter G. Spohn (1914–2003), the founder of the American Anaplastology Association
Martin Hengel (1926–2009), Protestant parson and historian
Willi Betz (1927–2015), founder of the Willi Betz company
Friedrich Wilhelm Schnitzler (1928–2011), landowner, business manager and politician (CDU)
Roland Kayn (1933–2011), organist and composer
Ernst Messerschmid (born 1945), astronaut and physicist
Claus Kleber (born 1955), television journalist
Dominik Kuhn (born 1969), producer, language artist and comedian

References

External links

  
 The University of Applied Sciences in Reutlingen
 
RSV website (in German)

 
Cities in Baden-Württemberg
Reutlingen (district)
1803 disestablishments
Former states and territories of Baden-Württemberg
States and territories established in 1240
1726 in the Holy Roman Empire
Populated places on the Neckar basin
Populated riverside places in Germany
Württemberg